is a Japanese manga series written and illustrated by Tenya Yabuno based on a series of video games created by Level-5. The manga has been published by Shogakukan in CoroCoro Comic since the June 2008 issue. The manga series won the 2010 Kodansha Manga Award and 2011 Shogakukan Manga Award in the Children's Manga category.

Plot

Endou Mamoru is a cheerful goalkeeper at Raimon Jr High, who has six other players on his team. The team is threatened with disbandment unless they can win a match against the Teikoku Gakuen, the best team in Japan. Endou tries to save the team by gathering four more players. In the second series, Endou and his team have to gather players to defeat the new enemies, Aliea Gakuen. In the third series, the Football Frontier International is announced and Inazuma Japan is assembled; it is coached by Kudou Michiya.

  (Mark Evans) (Captain, Goal Keeper, Libero) – Endou a cheerful goalkeeper.
  (Axel Blaze) (Forward) – Gouenji is the ace striker and voice of reason of the team. 
  (Jude Sharp) (Midfielder) – Kidou wears goggles and a red cape.
  (Shawn Froste) (Forward, Defender) – When the Raimon Eleven team first meets him, he is the captain of Hakuren Junior High School's Football club in Hokkaido, and is both an excellent defender and the team's ace striker.
  (Nathan Swift) (Defender) – Originally a member of the track team, Kazemaru is convinced by Endou to become a player on the football team.
  (Jack Wallside) (Defender) – Despite his height, he is a really shy person.
  (Bobby Shearer) (Defender) – Domon used to live in America with Aki, but did not care for football because of an accident involving one of his best friends. 
  (Erik Eagle) (Midfielder) – Ichinose is childhood friends with Domon and Aki. 
  (Silvia Woods) (Manager) – Aki is the team manager. She used to play football but stopped after experiencing a horrible trauma.
  (Celia Hills) (Manager) – Originally from the school paper, after seeing Raimon play against Teikoku she became a big fan and decided to be a manager. 
  (Nelly Raimon) (Manager) – She is the daughter of the chairman of the school and is the student council president. She becomes a manager because of Endou's passion for football. 
  (Timothy "Timmy" Sanders) (Defender) – Another member of Endou's original team, usually playing as a defender. 
  (David Evans [Fake name: David Arrows]) (Supporter, Goal Keeper, Coach) – Endou's grandfather and the original Inazuma Eleven's coach.
  (Steve Grim) (Midfielder) – Another of Endou's teammates. He usually plays as a defender, but sometimes he plays in a forward position.
  (William "Willy" Glass) (Forward) – A little pretentious and later becomes a manager.
  (Jim Wrath) (Defender) – Kageno joined the team to help and get people to know him. 
  (Sam Kincaid) (Midfielder) – Another of Endo's teammates. Shishido is versatile and often does a little of everything.
  (Maxwell "Max" Carson) (Midfielder) – Another one of Endo's original teammates.
  (Todd Ironside) (Defender) – Like Shourin, Kurimatsu is one of the shortest members of the team. He has a bucktooth and a bandage across his nose.
  (Victoria "Tori" Vanguard) (Defender) – She is the daughter of the prime minister and the captain of the Eleven In Black. 
  (Scott "Sneaky Scotty" Banyan) (Defender) – Kogure is a small character with a prankster attitude.
  (Suzette "Sue" Heartland) (Forward) – Rika is on a girls' football team in Osaka.
  (Hurley Kane) (Defender) – Tsunami loves to surf and is the oldest in the team at 15.
  (Darren LaChance) (Midfielder, Goalkeeper) – He is a big fan of Endou, and also the second goalkeeper of Inazuma Japan.
  (Xavier Foster) (Midfielder) – Growing up in an orphanage, the only 'parent' he knew was an elderly man who frequently visited the orphanage.
  (Jordan Greenway) (Midfielder) – He is the captain of Gemini Storm, the second rank team of Aliea Academy and the best friend of Hiroto Kiyama. 
  (Austin Hobbes) (Forward) – He is a new character introduced in the FFI Arc.
  (Archer Hawkins) (Defender) – He is a new character introduced in the FFI Arc.

Volumes
The Inazuma Eleven manga series, based on the video game series of the same name, was written and illustrated by Tenya Yabuno. It began publication in the June 2008 issue of the Shogakukan magazine CoroCoro Comic and ended in the September 2011 issue. A total of ten tankōbon (bound) volumes of Inazuma Eleven have been released in Japan between September 26, 2008 and October 28, 2011.

Media

Anime television series

The animated series, Inazuma Eleven (イナズマイレブン Inazuma Irebun, lit. "Lightning Eleven"), was produced by OLM, Inc. and Dentsu Inc., and directed by Katsuhito Akiyama. 127 episodes aired on TV Tokyo from October 5, 2008 to April 27, 2011.

The series was available for video on-demand streaming via Toon Goggles.

The second series, Inazuma Eleven Go! (イナズマイレブンGO!), adapted from the manga of the same name, began airing on May 4, 2011.

Anime film

Guidebooks
A series of three guidebooks to the first anime series have been published by Shogakukan. The books detail the television episodes and include player information and uniform catalogs.

Reception
Inazuma Eleven won "Best Children's Manga" at the 34th annual Kodansha Manga Awards.

According to Kogyo Tsushinsha, the first film, Inazuma Eleven Saikyō Gundan Ōga Shūrai, debuted in second place at the Japanese box office for the weekend of December 25 and 26, 2010. By February 6, 2011, the film had grossed US$ 21,099,188 by its seventh week of screening in the country.

References

External links

 Inazuma Eleven Series (meta series official site) 
 Inazuma World 
 TV Tokyo Inazuma Eleven site  
 Inazuma Eleven at Cartoon Network (Philippines)
 Inazuma Eleven  at Cartoon Network (Southeast Asia)
 
 

Inazuma Eleven
2008 manga
Association football in anime and manga
Children's manga
Manga based on video games
Shogakukan manga
Winner of Kodansha Manga Award (Children)
Winners of the Shogakukan Manga Award for children's manga